Higher Than a Kite is a 1943 short subject directed by Del Lord starring American slapstick comedy team The Three Stooges (Moe Howard, Larry Fine and Curly Howard). It is the 72nd entry in the series released by Columbia Pictures starring the comedians, who released 190 shorts for the studio between 1934 and 1959.

Plot
The Stooges want to fly for the Royal Air Force, but end up as mechanics working in an airport garage. When given the assignment of getting a mysterious squeaking sound out of the Colonel's car from his assistant Kelly (Duke York), they get sidetracked after Moe's head gets stuck in a pipe. After several painful attempts, they finally pull Moe's head out. Then, he angrily chases Larry and Curly around the vehicle, accidentally breaking the windshield in the process. The Stooges disassemble the entire engine trying to find the problem, and are still puzzled, as they are not exactly certain what a squeak looks like. Kelly comes back to retrieve the Colonel's car, with the Stooges still hoping to be airmen.

The trio promptly evacuate the garage after Kelly realizes what they have done, only to end up hiding out in a blockbuster mistaken for a sewer pipe. The blockbuster is then dropped behind enemy lines (reflecting the recent British bombing of Cologne, Germany in June 1942). Moe and Curly quickly disguise themselves as German officers and Larry disguises himself as a woman (Moronica). General Bommel (Dick Curtis) and Marshall Boring (Vernon Dent) (parodies of German generals Erwin Rommel and Hermann Göring) then enter, and go about flirting with "Moronica". The Stooges eventually steal enemy secrets from under the nose of the Nazi officers, knock them cold, and escape. During their escape, a photo of Adolf Hitler gets stuck on Curly's butt. A bulldog wearing a "U.S. Marines" coat and helmet runs in and bites Curly where Hitler's photo is, and Curly runs off with the bulldog still hanging from his hindquarters.

Cast

Credited
 Moe Howard as Moe
 Larry Fine as Larry
 Curly Howard as Curly

Uncredited
 Duke York as Kelly
 Dick Curtis as General Bommel
 Johnny Kascier as German Soldier
 Vernon Dent as Marshall Boring
 George Gray as German Soldier
 Joe Garcio as German Soldier

Production notes
Higher Than a Kite was filmed over five days on February 20–25, 1943. It was the only Stooge film to feature supporting actor Duke York in a non-monster role.

Footage of Moe getting his head wedged inside a pipe was reused in the 1960 compilation feature film Stop! Look! and Laugh!.

References

External links
 
 
Higher Than a Kite at threestooges.net

1943 films
The Three Stooges films
American black-and-white films
Cultural depictions of Adolf Hitler
American World War II films
American aviation films
Films directed by Del Lord
1943 comedy films
Military humor in film
World War II films made in wartime
Columbia Pictures short films
American comedy short films
1940s English-language films